Mount Stewart is a rural municipality in Prince Edward Island, Canada. It is located in the northeastern part of Queens County, at the head of the once-navigable portion of the Hillsborough River at the point where the river begins to narrow significantly. Mount Stewart had a population of 226 at the time of the 2021 Census.

The community played an important role in the province's early transportation history, being the site of a bridge over the river along the route between the capital at Charlottetown and the shire town of Kings County at Georgetown.

History 
In the early 1870s, the Prince Edward Island Railway ran its mainline between both communities through Mount Stewart. If any one wanted to travel to Georgetown or Souris  from Charlottetown, they would have to come through or make a stop at Mount Stewart. Mount Stewart also came to be referred to as Mount Stewart Junction after the PEIR built a line northeast to Morell and Souris. During the 1930s, the community became the centre of all railway service accessing eastern PEI after the Hillsborough River Bridge carrying the railway line to Murray Harbour between Charlottetown and Southport was condemned. The CNR constructed what was known as the "Short Line" between Mount Stewart and Lake Verde, permitting rail traffic to continue to serve the southeastern part of the province. People would also use the railways to transport vegetables, potatoes, lumber, and other resources. The last train that came here was from Charlottetown in 1989, it was also when the railway stopped running.

Demographics 

Education 
There is one school that is operating in Mt. Stewart currently. It was built May 7, 1976. It is located 120 Main Street, Mount Stewart, PE. There are approximately 160 students as of April 2013. The grades are Kindergarten up to Grade Eight. In 2009 two schools joined Mount Stewart Consolidated, such as St. Teresa's and Tracadie Cross. After students finish grade eight they go to Morell Regional High School for grades 9-12. The school that was operating before the current school is now being used for storage.

Sports 
Baseball in Mount Stewart and surrounding areas was and still is very popular. The teams have won the Atlantic championships over many years. They also had a team in the KCBL (Kings County Baseball League). Some of the local boys went to the Florida Rookie League. This league was for males in university who show dedication to playing pro ball.

References 

Communities in Queens County, Prince Edward Island
Rural municipalities in Prince Edward Island